Lisa Gunning is an English film director, editor and writer.

She began her career in 1990s, following her graduation from University College London, where she studied English. In 1998, she met director Anthony Minghella while working on a spot for Comic Relief followed by the short Play as part of the Samuel Beckett season for Channel 4 which marked the beginning of a long running collaboration.  After working on some musical sequences in The Talented Mr Ripley, her first feature was Minghella's Breaking & Entering followed by his flagship pilot for The No.1 Ladies Detective Agency. She went on to work with John Madden on crime thriller Killshot,  Salmon Fishing in the Yemen for Lasse Hallström and Seven Psychopaths for Martin McDonagh.  Gunning has also collaborated extensively with artist and filmmaker Sam Taylor-Wood on her BAFTA Award-winning short film Love You More, her first feature film Nowhere Boy and'50 Shades of Grey.

In 2013, she wrote, directed and edited a 30-minute film for the band Goldfrapp based on five stories from their album Tales of Us''.  The film was streamed to over 400 cinemas across the world in March 2014 and won the award of Best Music Video at the 2014 Byron Bay International Film Festival.

Gunning dated musician Alison Goldfrapp from 2007 - 2017 

In 2021 Gunning directed 3 episodes of The Power for Sister Pictures/Amazon.

References

External links
 

English film editors
English film directors
Alumni of University College London
Living people
Year of birth missing (living people)
British women film editors
English women film directors